Consiglio Di Nino (born January 24, 1938) is a Canadian businessman and former Senate of Canada senator from 1990 to 2012.

Early life and career
Born in Italy, Di Nino immigrated to Canada with his family at the age of 13. He attended St Michael's College School in Toronto before going to the University of Toronto and York University.

Beginning as a bank teller in 1955, Di Nino rose to a management position at the Toronto-Dominion Bank and eventually became an executive at Realty Capital Corporation. In 1979, he founded and became CEO of Cabot Trust (which eventually became Cabot Capital Corporation). He left in 1991 to become a consultant in the financial sector.

Political career
In 1990, Di Nino was appointed to the Senate on the recommendation of Prime Minister Brian Mulroney. He sat as a Progressive Conservative until 2004 when he and most of his Tory colleagues joined the Conservative Party of Canada. He served as Government Whip in the Senate from January 1, 2010 to May 24, 2011. He resigned on June 30, 2012, seven months before his mandatory retirement.

One of Di Nino's interests in the Senate has been the status of Tibet. Di Nino has given a number of speeches and written letters urging a boycott of the People's Republic of China because of its occupation of that country.

Di Nino has also been heavily involved in the Italian-Canadian community as past chair of Villa Charities Incorporated (a charity founded by the Italian-Canadian business community), past president of the Canadian Italian Business and Professional Association, Villa Colombo Home for the Aged and the Columbus Centre of Toronto. He also served as president of Harbourfront Corporation, a federal agency responsible for Toronto's waterfront.

See also
List of Ontario senators

References

External links

1938 births
Living people
Businesspeople from Ontario
Canadian senators from Ontario
Conservative Party of Canada senators
Progressive Conservative Party of Canada senators
Italian emigrants to Canada
21st-century Canadian politicians